Muhammad Wasi Zafar (12 January 1949 – 7 August 2021) was a Pakistani politician. He was the former Law minister of Pakistan. He was born in the city of Multan in Punjab, Pakistan. He was a lawyer and became a member of the National Assembly on a PML(Q) ticket. Zafar was unable to run in the February 2008 parliamentary election as a PML(Q) candidate and instead ran unsuccessfully as an independent. Zafar received media attention during the election campaign for verbally threatening a television journalist during a live telecast.

References

1949 births
2021 deaths
Pakistan Muslim League (Q) politicians
Pakistani lawyers
Politicians from Multan
Punjabi people